Demoniciduth is a Swiss extreme metal band formed in 1998.

Background

Demoniciduth formed in October 1998 in Switzerland. The band has had several member changes, minus bassist and vocalist Taanak. The band formed with Taanak and his brother Annihilith. Annihilith departed from the band and hired on several members, Ashtaroth-Karnaïm (vocals), Nahalal (guitars) and Kisloth (drums). The band was originally named Satanicide, but changed names due to an already existing band named Satanicide from the United States. The band then renamed themselves, Demonicide. And for third and final time, the band switched to their current name, Demoniciduth. The band is bold in their faith with Christian lyrics. The band even included an advisory sticker, stating:

There were several lineup changes during this time, which subsequently forced the band to go on hiatus in March 2002. The band played at Elements of Rock in 2004. The band reunited around 2010, and released an EP in 2011 with the style similar to bands such as Mortification. In 2016, the band announced they had signed to Vision of God Records and will be releasing their second full-length, entitled, Enemy of Satan.

Name
The band addressed the popular question of what the name means. Here is what was said:

Members
Current
 Taanak - bass, vocals (1998–present)
 Lord Ekkletus - guitars, backing vocals
 Sir Krino - drums

Former
 Karkor - drums
 Tseror - guitars, vocals
 Ashtaroth-Karnaďm - vocals (1999-2002)
 Annihilith - drums (1998)
 Nahalal - guitars (1998-2001)
 Kisloth - guitars, drums (1998-1999)
 Genezareth - drums (1999-2000)
 Nahum - drums (2000-2001)
 Haroscheth - guitars (2000-2002)
 Hazaël - drums, vocals (2001-2004)
 Lemekh - guitars (2002-2004)
 Jéhu - drums (2001)

Discography
Studio albums
 Post Tenebras Lux (2002)
 Enemy of Satan (2017)

EPs
 Post Tenebras Lux (2001)
 The Valley of the Shadow/Dogs of AntiChrist (2005; Split w/ Sabbatariam)
 The Valley of Decision (2012)

Demos
 Pre-Release (1999)

References

Bibliography

Musical groups established in 1998
Christian metal musical groups
Swiss Christian metal musical groups